WBZK may refer to:
WULR, a radio station (980 AM) licensed to serve York, South Carolina, which held the call sign WBZK from 1978 to 2008
 WBT-FM, a radio station (99.3 FM) licensed to serve Chester, South Carolina, which held the call sign WBZK-FM from 1993 to 1995